Benzoxazole is an aromatic organic compound with a molecular formula C7H5NO, a benzene-fused oxazole ring structure, and an odor similar to pyridine. Although benzoxazole itself is of little practical value, many derivatives of benzoxazoles are commercially important.

Being a heterocyclic compound, benzoxazole finds use in research as a starting material for the synthesis of larger, usually bioactive structures. Its aromaticity makes it relatively stable, although as a heterocycle, it has reactive sites which allow for functionalization.

Occurrence and applications
It is found within the chemical structures of pharmaceutical drugs such as flunoxaprofen and tafamidis.  Benzoxazole derivatives are also of interest for optical brighteners in laundry detergents. Benzoxazoles belong to the group of well-known antifungal agents with antioxidant, antiallergic, antitumoral and antiparasitic activity.

See also
Structural isomers
Anthranil, an analog with the oxygen atom in position 2
Benzisoxazole, an analog with the nitrogen atom in position 2

Analogs
 Benzimidazole, an analog with the oxygen replaced by a nitrogen
 Benzothiazole, an analog with the oxygen replaced by a sulfur
 Benzopyrrole or indole, an analog without the oxygen atom
 Benzofuran, an analog without the nitrogen atom

References

Aromatic bases
 
Simple aromatic rings
Foul-smelling chemicals